Bothell East is a census-designated place (CDP) in Snohomish County, Washington, United States. The population was 8,018 at the 2010 census. Bothell East is one of several CDPs that were created out of the former North Creek CDP in 2010.

Bothell East, along with Bothell West, are recognized as part of Bothell.

Geography
Bothell East is located at  (47.806511, -122.184306).

According to the United States Census Bureau, the CDP has a total area of 2.05 square miles (5.31 km), all of it land.

References 

Census-designated places in Washington (state)
Census-designated places in Snohomish County, Washington